The 2022–23 WNBL season is the 43rd season of the competition since its establishment in 1981. The Melbourne Boomers are the defending champions.

Cygnett was named as the WNBL's naming rights partner for this season, after signing a three-year deal in September 2022. Spalding again provided equipment including the official game ball, alongside iAthletic supplying team apparel for the sixth consecutive season.

In June 2022, the season structure was confirmed to feature an 84-game regular season and best-of-three Semi-Final & Grand Final series' to follow. The WNBL later announced in September 2022 that a new broadcast deal had been signed with the 9Now and ESPN for the upcoming season.

Player movement

Standings

Finals

Statistics

Individual statistic leaders

Individual game highs

Awards

Player of the Round

Team of the Round

Postseason Awards

Team captains and coaches

References

External links 
 WNBL official website

Basketball
2022 in women's basketball
Basketball
Australia